Elgiszewo  is a village in the administrative district of Gmina Ciechocin, within Golub-Dobrzyń County, Kuyavian-Pomeranian Voivodeship, in north-central Poland. It was part of Prussia from 1815, and then the German Empire from 1871, before becoming Polish again in 1919.

The village has a population of 1,000.

References

Elgiszewo